Vaccinium bracteatum, the sea bilberry or Asiatic bilberry, is a species of Vaccinium native to Japan, the Ryukyu Islands, Korea, southeast and south central China, Hainan, Taiwan, mainland Southeast Asia, Java, and Sumatra. It is a small tree or large shrub, with dark purple edible fruit. It is in semi-cultivation in China. Local people collect and consume the fruit, and in addition extract a bluish-violet dye from the leaves, which is used as a hair dye, for coloring vinegar, and in cooking. The dye turns black when cooked with rice, providing culinary interest.

Varieties
The following varieties are currently accepted:

Vaccinium bracteatum var. chinense (Champ. ex Benth.) Chun ex Sleumer
Vaccinium bracteatum var. obovatum C.Y.Wu & R.C.Fang
Vaccinium bracteatum var. rubellum P.S.Hsu, J.X.Qiu, S.F.Huang & Y.Zhang
Vaccinium bracteatum var. thysanocalyx (Dop) Smitinand & P.H.Hô

References

bracteatum
Plant dyes
Plants described in 1784